Port Harcourt City Airport  is a military airport serving Port Harcourt NAF Base and various other aviation companies in Nigeria.

The Port Harcourt non-directional beacon (Ident: PH) is located on the field.

Airlines and destinations

See also
Transport in Nigeria
List of airports in Nigeria

References

 Google Earth

External links
OurAirports - Port Harcourt City
OpenStreetMap - Port Harcourt City

Airports in Rivers State